Amazon Aurora is a relational database service developed and offered by Amazon Web Services beginning in October 2014. Aurora is available as part of the Amazon Relational Database Service (RDS).

History 
Aurora offered MySQL compatible service upon its release in 2014. It added PostgreSQL compatibility in October 2017. 

In August 2017, Aurora Fast Cloning (copy-on-write) feature was added allowing customers to create copies of their databases. In May 2018, Aurora Backtrack was added which allows developers to rewind database clusters without creating a new one. It became possible to stop and start Aurora Clusters in September 2018. In August 2018, Amazon began to offer a serverless version.

In 2019 the developers of Aurora won the SIGMOD Systems Award for fundamentally redesigning relational database storage for cloud environments.

Features 

Aurora automatically allocates database storage space in 10-gigabyte increments, as needed, up to a maximum of 128 terabytes. Aurora offers automatic, six-way replication of those chunks across three Availability Zones for improved availability and fault-tolerance. 

Aurora provides users with performance metrics, such as query throughput and latency. It provides fast database cloning.

Aurora Multi-Master allows creation of multiple read-write instances in an Aurora database across multiple Availability Zones, which enables uptime-sensitive applications to achieve continuous write availability through instance failure.

MySQL compatibility 

Amazon designed Aurora to be compatible with MySQL, meaning that tools for querying or managing MySQL databases (such as the  command-line client and the MySQL Workbench graphical user-interface) can be used. As of December 2021, Amazon Aurora is compatible with MySQL 5.6, 5.7, and 8.0. It supports InnoDB as a storage engine.

Performance 

Amazon claims fivefold performance improvements on benchmarking tests over MySQL on the same hardware, due to "tightly integrating the database engine with an SSD-based virtualized storage layer purpose-built for database workloads, reducing writes to the storage system, minimizing lock contention and eliminating delays created by database process threads". Other independent tests have shown that Aurora performs better than competing technologies on some, but not all, combinations of workload and instance type.

See also 
 Amazon Relational Database Service
Amazon DocumentDB

References

External links
Amazon Aurora: Design Considerations for High Throughput Cloud-Native Relational Databases - SIGMOD'17 (ACM digital library)

2014 software
Aurora
Cloud databases